Wanderley Paiva Monteiro (born 7 April 1946), commonly known as Wanderley Paiva or as Vanderlei Paiva, is a Brazilian professional football coach and former player. He was a defensive midfielder who played mostly for Atlético Mineiro, and also represented the Brazil national team at international level. Paiva won the Bola de Prata in 1971.

Career

Player

Clubs
Wanderley Paiva was born in Três Corações, in the state of Minas Gerais, and in his youth he played for local side Atlético. After refusing an offer from Rio de Janeiro (state)'s Olaria, he was contacted and signed by Atlético Mineiro in 1966.With the Belo Horizonte club, Paiva became a first-team regular, and was part of the squad which won the first Campeonato Brasileiro Série A in 1971. He played 27 matches and scored one goal in that season, and was selected for the team of the tournament, winning the Bola de Prata, awarded by Placar magazine. Wanderley scored Atlético Mineiro's first goal in an official international competition in 1972, and is the second player with most appearances for the club, with 559.

In 1975, he left Atlético and joined América de São José do Rio Preto, where he remained until 1976. He then moved to Ponte Preta, with which he was runner-up of the Campeonato Paulista in 1977. He played for Ponte Preta until 1980, when he was signed by Palmeiras, where stayed for just one season, appearing 19 times and scoring one goal. Wanderley then moved to Londrina, and subsequently to Comercial from Ribeirão Preto, where he ended his career.

National team
Paiva was first capped for the Brazil national football team on 19 December 1968, when Atlético Mineiro represented the Seleção against Yugoslavia and won 3–2. He only returned to the national side in 1975, when he was called up for that year's Copa América, in which he played six games, as Brazil finished in third place.

Manager
After retiring from playing, Wanderley Paiva became manager of the Ponte Preta youth squads. In the 2000s, he coached professional sides Juventus, CRAC, Ponte Preta, União São João and Corinthians Alagoano. His best season was in 2004 with CRAC, when he led the club to victory in the Campeonato Goiano, the state league of Goiás, for the second time in its history.

Honours

Player

Club 
Atlético Mineiro
Campeonato Brasileiro Série A: 1971
Campeonato Mineiro: 1970

Individual 
Bola de Prata: 1971

Manager 
CRAC
Campeonato Goiano: 2004

References

External links 
Wanderley Paiva at Galo Digital 

1946 births
Living people
People from Três Corações
Brazilian footballers
Brazilian football managers
Association football midfielders
Campeonato Brasileiro Série A players
Campeonato Brasileiro Série A managers
Campeonato Brasileiro Série B managers
Brazil international footballers
Clube Atlético Mineiro players
América Futebol Clube (SP) players
Sociedade Esportiva Palmeiras players
Associação Atlética Ponte Preta players
Londrina Esporte Clube players
Comercial Futebol Clube (Ribeirão Preto) players
São José Esporte Clube managers
Comercial Futebol Clube (Ribeirão Preto) managers
Joinville Esporte Clube managers
Ferroviário Atlético Clube (CE) players
Clube Atlético Juventus managers
Londrina Esporte Clube managers
Associação Atlética Ponte Preta managers
Figueirense FC managers
Marília Atlético Clube managers
Clube Recreativo e Atlético Catalano managers
União São João Esporte Clube managers
Agremiação Sportiva Arapiraquense managers
Sport Club Corinthians Alagoano managers
Sportspeople from Minas Gerais
Ferroviário Atlético Clube (CE) managers
Associação Atlética Internacional (Limeira) managers
Vila Nova Futebol Clube managers
Sociedade Esportiva do Gama managers
Paulista Futebol Clube managers